Rachiplusia is a genus of moths of the family Noctuidae.

Species
 Rachiplusia grisea Barbut, 2008
 Rachiplusia nu Guenée, 1852
 Rachiplusia ou Guenée, 1852
 Rachiplusia virgula Blanchard, 1852

References
 Barbut, J. (2008). "Révision du genre Rachiplusia Hampson, 1913 (Lepidoptera, Noctuidae, Plusiinae)." Bulletin de la Société entomologique de France 113(4): 445-452. 
 Natural History Museum Lepidoptera genus database

Plusiinae
Moth genera